Erik Gösta Andersson (15 February 1917 – 12 September 1975), known as Gösta Andersson, was a Swedish welterweight Greco-Roman wrestler. He competed at the 1948 and 1952 Summer Olympics and won a gold and a silver medal, respectively.

In the 1948 final against Miklós Szilvási Andersson cut his eyebrow while leading 3:0. The referee allowed the bout to continue despite strong bleeding, and Andersson won the gold medal. He lost to Szilvási in the 1952 Olympic final.

References

External links

 

1917 births
1975 deaths
People from Sundsvall Municipality
Olympic wrestlers of Sweden
Wrestlers at the 1948 Summer Olympics
Wrestlers at the 1952 Summer Olympics
Swedish male sport wrestlers
Olympic gold medalists for Sweden
Olympic silver medalists for Sweden
Olympic medalists in wrestling
World Wrestling Championships medalists
Medalists at the 1952 Summer Olympics
Medalists at the 1948 Summer Olympics
European Wrestling Champions
Sportspeople from Västernorrland County